DYKO (104.1 FM) was a radio station owned and operated by Bombo Radyo Philippines through its licensee People's Broadcasting Service, Inc. The station's studio and transmitter were located at Oyo Torong St. cor. J. Magno St., Kalibo. It was formerly known as Star FM from 1997 to 2006, when it went off the air.

References

Radio stations in Aklan
Radio stations established in 1997
Radio stations disestablished in 2006
Defunct radio stations in the Philippines
Kalibo